The 2012 New Era Pinstripe Bowl was a post-season American college football bowl game held on December 29, 2012 at Yankee Stadium in the New York City borough of The Bronx in the United States. The third edition of the Pinstripe Bowl began at 3:15 p.m. EST and aired on ESPN. It featured the West Virginia Mountaineers from the Big 12 Conference against the Big East Conference co-champion Syracuse Orange and was the final game of the 2012 NCAA Division I FBS football season for both teams.  Both the Orange and the Mountaineers advanced to the game after accomplishing 7–5 records in the regular season.

The Mountaineers and the Orange had a notable continuous rivalry from 1955 until 2011. This included the years in the  Big East Conference, which was established in 1979. The winner of the game was awarded the Ben Schwartzwalder Trophy from its establishment in 1993.  That trophy was not on the line in the Pinstripe Bowl.

Teams

This was the sixtieth meeting between these two teams. Syracuse leads the all-time record 33–27. The last time they played was in 2011.

West Virginia

The Mountaineers' first season as a member of the Big 12 started out smoothly, cruising to a 5–0 start and a #4 ranking.  However, the Mountaineers would later receive a serious reality check in the form of a five-game losing streak.  However, after winning their final two games of the season over the Iowa State Cyclones and Kansas Jayhawks, the Mountaineers would rebound to a 4–5 conference record.

Syracuse

With a 5–2 conference record the Orange became one of four Big East co-champions along with the Louisville Cardinals, Rutgers Scarlet Knights, and Cincinnati Bearcats.

This was the Orange's second Pinstripe Bowl; in the inaugural 2010 game they had defeated the Kansas State Wildcats by a score of 36–34 after a controversial excessive celebration call led to the Wildcats missing what would have been the game-tying two-point conversion.  It was also the Orange's final game as a member of the Big East before they joined the Atlantic Coast Conference in 2013.
This was the Mountaineers' first appearance in the Pinstripe Bowl.

Referee: Jay Strickerz (Pac-12 Conference)

Game summary

Box score

Statistics

Notes
 Syracuse converted the first safety in Pinstripe Bowl history.
 Syracuse and West Virginia had previously met annually since 1955 when West Virginia was a member of the Big East. The two teams played for the Ben Schwartzwalder Trophy. The victory gave Syracuse an all-time series lead of 33–27.
 Game was played in heavy snowfall.

References

External links
 Box score at ESPN

Pinstripe Bowl
Pinstripe Bowl
Syracuse Orange football bowl games
West Virginia Mountaineers football bowl games
Pinstripe Bowl
December 2012 sports events in the United States
2010s in the Bronx